Raimonds is a Latvian masculine given name and may refer to:
Raimonds Bergmanis (born 1966), Latvian weightlifting champion, strongman and Olympic competitor 
Raimonds Feldmanis (born 1982), Latvian basketballer and coach
Raimonds Karnītis (1929–1999), Latvian basketball player and coach
Raimonds Laizāns (born 1964), Latvian football goalkeeper
Raimonds Miglinieks (born 1970), Latvian professional basketball player 
Raimonds Pauls (born 1936), Latvian composer and pianist
Raimonds Staprans (born 1926), Latvian playwright 
Raimonds Vaikulis (born 1980), Latvian professional basketball guard 
Raimonds Vējonis (born 1966), Latvian politician 
Raimonds Vilde (born 1962), Latvian volleyball player and Olympic competitor
Raimonds Vilkoits (born 1990), Latvian professional ice hockey player

Latvian masculine given names